The 1974 Cotton Bowl Classic was played on January 1 at the Cotton Bowl in Dallas, Texas. It matched the Texas Longhorns of the Southwest Conference and the Nebraska Cornhuskers of the

Teams

Nebraska

The Cornhuskers were runners-up to Oklahoma in the Big Eight for a second straight year; Tom Osborne was in his first year as head coach (after four years as the offensive coordinator under Bob Devaney). Their only previous Cotton Bowl appearance was in January 1965, and they had won the previous three Orange Bowls. The offense was led by junior southpaw quarterback David Humm, with Tony Davis at I-back.   line was anchored by John Dutton, the fifth pick in the 1974 NFL Draft

Texas

The Longhorns were Southwest Conference champions for the sixth straight year, and played in their sixth consecutive Cotton Bowl Classic. Led by head coach Darrell Royal, Texas was favored by

Game summary
Texas scored first on a 22-yard field goal by Billy Schott. With nine minutes later in the half came a hit that led to three points. Longhorn fullback Roosevelt Leaks was hit hard while Texas was driving at the 29, and the ball shot up into the air. Husker defensive end Steve Manstedt saw the ball pop into the air, grabbed the ball, and returned it 65 yards to the Texas 6. Though they could not find the end zone, Nebraska scored with a 24-yard field goal by Rich Sanger, and the teams went to halftime tied at three each.

At halftime, Osborne replaced David Humm with senior reserve Steve Runty, a better  The second half was dominated by Nebraska, with 16 points added and none allowed. Ritch Bahe scored on a 12-yard run late in the quarter to make  With 1:23 left in the quarter, Tony Davis scored from three yards out to increase the lead  Texas could not respond, as they turned the ball over five times and gained less than 200 yards. Sanger added a field goal midway through the fourth quarter to complete the scoring   the Huskers' only Cotton Bowl 

Over two thousand tickets went unsold, the first time in twelve years that the game did not sell out.

Scoring

First quarter
Texas – Field goal, Billy Schott 22

Second quarter
Nebraska – Field goal, Rich Sanger 24

Third quarter
Nebraska – Ritch Bahe 12 run (Sanger kick)
Nebraska – Tony Davis 3 run (kick failed)

Fourth quarter
Nebraska – Field goal, Sanger 43

Statistics
{| class=wikitable style="text-align:center"
! Statistics !!  Nebraska   !! Texas
|-
|align=left|First downs || 21|| 11
|-
|align=left|Rushes–yards|| 58–240|| 37–106
|-
|align=left|Passing yards|| 91|| 90
|-
|align=left|Passes|| 7–17–2||7–17–2
|-
|align=left|Total yards || 331|| 196
|-
|align=left|Punts–average ||3–40.0|| 4–39.8
|-
|align=left|Fumbles–lost ||3–1|| 6–3
|-
|align=left|Turnovers by|| 3|| 5
|-
|align=left|Penalties–yards ||4–51|| 2–30
|}

Aftermath
In the final AP poll in January, Nebraska improved to seventh and Texas fell to fourteenth.
This was the last season that the final UPI coaches poll was released before the bowls.

This was the last Cotton Bowl appearance for Texas under Royal; he retired after the 1976 season, but his successor Fred Akers led them back in his first season in January 1978. The Huskers returned in 1980 and 2007, but lost both.

See also
 Nebraska–Texas football rivalry

References

Cotton Bowl Classic
Cotton Bowl Classic
Nebraska Cornhuskers football bowl games
Texas Longhorns football bowl games
Cotton Bowl Classic
Cotton Bowl Classic